Maar is a surname. Notable people with the surname include:
 Andy Maar (born 1983), Luxembourgish politician
 Dora Maar (1907–1997), French photographer, painter, and poet
 Henry Maar (1921–1992), a pioneer in balloon twisting
 Marc de Maar (born 1984), Curaçaoan road racing cyclist
 Michael Maar (born 1960), German literary scholar, germanist, and author
 Paul Maar (born 1937), German novelist, playwright, translator, and illustrator
 Pons Maar (born 1951), American actor, puppeteer, artist and filmmaker
 Stephen Maar (born 1994), Canadian volleyball player